Roketz is a multidirectional shooter released for the Amiga 1200 in 1995 and MS-DOS in 1996. It has gravity-based, thrust-and-turn gameplay similar to the game Thrust.

Reception

References

External links
 Legal download

1995 video games
Shoot 'em ups
Amiga games
Amiga 1200 games
DOS games
Multidirectional shooters
Video games developed in Estonia